Frontier is a village in the Canadian province of Saskatchewan within the Rural Municipality of Frontier No. 19 and Census Division No. 4. Frontier is on Highway 18 and is served by the Frontier Airport located (3.7 km) south of the village.

History 
The Frontier post office was founded in 1917. Frontier incorporated as a village on July 10, 1930.

Demographics 

Climate

Attractions

Frontier & District Golf Course, a 9-hole facility located in Frontier, features all the hallmarks of Saskatchewan golf.
Grasslands National Park, one of Canada's newer national parks, is located in southern Saskatchewan along the Montana border.
Cypress Hills Interprovincial Park, an interprovincial park straddling the southern Alberta-Saskatchewan border, located southeast of Medicine Hat. It is Canada's only interprovincial park.

Education

Frontier School offers Kindergarten through grade 12 and is in the Chinook School Division.

Notable people
Rhett Warrener, NHL player
Braydon Coburn, NHL player
 David L. Anderson, former Conservative Member of Parliament

See also 

 List of communities in Saskatchewan
 Villages of Saskatchewan

References

Villages in Saskatchewan
Frontier No. 19, Saskatchewan
Division No. 4, Saskatchewan